The Female Peronist Party (PPF) was an Argentine political party created in 1949 and dissolved in 1955. The party only accepted women and was founded by Eva Perón, who was also the first president of the party.

The PPF was organized and acted as an independent party, autonomous from the male-dominated Peronist Party. It counted with its own political structures and institutions. Under Eva Perón's leadership, the PPF sought to engage women in politics following the expansion of suffrage for women in 1947.

In 1955, following the military coup that ousted Juan Perón from power, the Female Peronist Party was disbanded alongside all other Peronist parties and organisations.

History 
After obtaining women's suffrage in 1947, First Lady Eva "Evita" Duarte de Perón realized that the mere existence of the law did not guarantee the presence of women among candidates with the possibility of being elected. For that reason, in 1949, along with other women who had been politically active since 1945, they decided to found the Female Peronist Party.

Origins 
The party, also known as the women's branch or women's party, was created at a meeting held at the Cervantes Theater on 26 July 1949. While run similarly to the men's branch, Eva ran the party completely separated from it. Yet, the party more functioned as branch and the women in the PPF were placed on Peronist Party lists. Similarly to the Peronist Party, many of its members were working-class emerging leaders.

Work 
The PPF was organized from unidades básicas femeninas ("female basic units") that were formed in neighborhoods and towns, channeling the direct political participation of women in the Peronist movement. During the economic crisis that hit Argentina during the early 1950s, these basic units offered classes in cooking, specifically meatless cuisine and the domestic economy, and also facilitated discussions on the Second Quinquennial Plan, all of which were done by volunteers and free for the general public. Similarly, to help in women to save on clothing, these units (along with the Peronist Association of Housewives) later provided free sewing, kitting and embroidery classes.

Through the PPF's efforts, a large number of women were elected in 1951 to occupy legislative positions: 23 national deputies, the largest number in the western hemisphere, 6 national senators, and 80 in provincial legislators. In the same year the PPF had 500 thousand members and over 3000 basic units.

Eva Peron's Death and Disbanding 
Following Eva's death in 1952, the party began losing strength and her husband Juan Perón followed her as president of the women's branch. Soon after, Perón gave up the presidency and gave it to congresswoman Delia Parodi . Like every other Perónist organization, it was disbanded by the military junta in 1955, after they overthrew Juan Perón on September 19, 1955 during the Revolución Libertadora.

See also 
 Feminism in Argentina

References 

Justicialist Party
1949 establishments in Argentina
1955 disestablishments in Argentina
Feminist parties
Peronist parties and alliances in Argentina
Political parties established in 1949
Political parties disestablished in 1955
Defunct political parties in Argentina
Third Position